The Comrades of Summer is a 1992 television film featuring Joe Mantegna and Natalya Negoda. It was directed by Tommy Lee Wallace, written by Robert Rodat and aired on HBO on July 11, 1992.

Plot
Major League Baseball manager Sparky Smith is fired from his job with the Seattle Mariners. His attitude has gotten him into trouble with George, the owner of the Mariners, and no other teams seem to want any part of him.

The Olympic Games are coming up, however, and a spirit of glasnost exists in the post-Soviet Russia, which is trying to field its first Olympic baseball team. Sparky reluctantly accepts an offer to move to Moscow to coach the players, many of whom don't even know the game's fundamentals. The players are predictably inept at first, but Sparky begins to learn the real joy in baseball is in the effort and the camaraderie.

An exhibition game ultimately is arranged in which Sparky and his young, eager Russians get to play against his old team, the Mariners. Sparky also falls in love with young Russian girl Tanya Belova.

Cast
 Joe Mantegna as Sparky
 Natalya Negoda as Tanya
 Michael Lerner as George
 Mark Rolston as Voronov

Production
Filming took place in Nat Bailey Stadium, Vancouver, British Columbia, Canada, and in Moscow, Russia.

References

External links 

1992 films
1992 television films
1990s sports films
American television films
American baseball films
Canadian television films
HBO Films films
Films directed by Tommy Lee Wallace
Films scored by William Olvis
Seattle Mariners
Films about the 1992 Summer Olympics
Films set in Moscow
Films shot in Moscow
Films shot in Vancouver
Sports television films
Canadian baseball films
1990s American films
1990s Canadian films